The 2021–22 ZZ Leiden season was the 35th season in the existence of the club, and the 15th season under the entity of ZZ Leiden. The club played its first season in the BNXT League, the newly established league which combines the Belgian and Dutch national leagues. 

Leiden won the inaugural BNXT championship and finished as runners-up in the Dutch playoffs.

Overview

Players

Squad information

Current roster

Depth chart

Transactions

In 

|}

Out

|}

FIBA Europe Cup

|-
!colspan=12 style=""|Regular season

|-
!colspan=12 style=""|Second round
|-

|-
!colspan=12 style=""|Quarterfinals
|-

|-
!colspan=12 style=""|Semifinals
|-

|}

References

ZZ Leiden
2021–22 FIBA Europe Cup